Desiree Rollocks (born 4 September 1970), better known by her stage name Daisy Dee, is a Dutch singer, actress, TV host, stylist, and television producer. She is well known in German-speaking media. Daisy Dee hosted the German television show Clubrotation on Viva/MTV until 2003.

Discography

Studio albums

Singles

As featured artist

References

External links
 D.D.Productions Official Website
 Daisy Dee's Official Website
 Daisy Dee's VJ page at VIVA TV
 

1970 births
Living people
Curaçao people of Dutch descent
Curaçao people of Spanish descent
Dutch dance musicians
Dutch record producers
Dutch people of Curaçao descent
Dutch people of Spanish descent
English-language singers from the Netherlands
21st-century Dutch singers
21st-century Dutch women singers
Women record producers